Multi-index notation is a mathematical notation that simplifies formulas used in multivariable calculus, partial differential equations and the theory of distributions, by generalising the concept of an integer index to an ordered tuple of indices.

Definition and basic properties

An n-dimensional multi-index is an n-tuple

of non-negative integers (i.e. an element of the n-dimensional set of natural numbers, denoted ).

For multi-indices  and  one defines:

Componentwise sum and difference

Partial order

Sum of components (absolute value) 

Factorial

Binomial coefficient

Multinomial coefficient
 where .
Power
.
Higher-order partial derivative
 where  (see also 4-gradient). Sometimes the notation  is also used.

Some applications
The multi-index notation allows the extension of many formulae from elementary calculus to the corresponding multi-variable case. Below are some examples.

Multinomial theorem

Multi-binomial theorem
Leibniz formula
For smooth functions f and g 
Taylor series
For an analytic function f in n variables one has  In fact, for a smooth enough function, we have the similar Taylor expansion  where the last term (the remainder) depends on the exact version of Taylor's formula. For instance, for the Cauchy formula (with integral remainder), one gets 
General linear partial differential operator
A formal linear N-th order partial differential operator in n variables is written as 
Integration by parts
For smooth functions with compact support in a bounded domain  one has  This formula is used for the definition of distributions and weak derivatives.

An example theorem

Proof
The proof follows from the power rule for the ordinary derivative; if α and β are in {0, 1, 2, …}, then

Then we have that

In the above, each partial differentiation  therefore reduces to the corresponding ordinary differentiation . Hence, from equation, it follows that  vanishes if αi > βi for at least one i in {1, …, n}. If this is not the case, i.e., if α ≤ β as multi-indices, then

for each  and the theorem follows. Q.E.D.

See also 

Einstein notation
Index notation
Ricci calculus

References 

 Saint Raymond, Xavier (1991). Elementary Introduction to the Theory of Pseudodifferential Operators. Chap 1.1 . CRC Press. 

Combinatorics
Mathematical notation
Articles containing proofs